Abdication of Nicholas II was a manifesto of the Emperor Nicholas II, signed in Pskov on 2 March (O.S.) / 15 March (N.S.) 1917, in the midst of World War I and the February Revolution. The Emperor renounced the throne of the Russian Empire on behalf of himself and his son, Tsarevich Alexei Nikolaevich, in favor of his brother Grand Duke Michael Alexandrovich. The next day the Grand Duke refused to accept the imperial authority, stating that he would accept it only if that was the consensus of democratic action by the Russian Constituent Assembly, which shall define the form of government for Russia. The rule of the 300 year-old House of Romanov ended with the Grand Duke's decision. Power in Russia then passed to the Russian Provisional Government, signaling the victory for the February Revolution.

Text of the manifesto

See also
Abdication of Wilhelm II

References

Bibliography

 
 

1917 in Russia
House of Romanov
Nicholas II of Russia
Russian Revolution
March 1917 events
Abdication
Politics of the Russian Empire
Dissolution of the Russian Empire